Kalmin (also Romanized as Kalmīn; also known as Galīn) is a village in Rudbar-e Mohammad-e Zamani Rural District, Alamut-e Gharbi District, Qazvin County, Qazvin Province, Iran. At the 2006 census, its population was 248, in 62 families.

References 

Populated places in Qazvin County